A Master of Business Engineering (MBE) is a two-year master's degree. The program combines management science, business administration, law and economics, technology, and engineering. The content of this academic degree is comparable with those of a Master of Business Administration (MBA) with additional engineering and technology content. The standard period of study is 24 months. According to the European Credit Transfer System (ECTS), one hundred twenty credit points are awarded for the degree. It is required to hold a bachelor's degree in business administration or engineering to get admission to this Master's program.

References

Business Engineering, Master
Business qualifications
Management education